Parasphaerocera is a genus of lesser dung flies (insects belonging to the family Sphaeroceridae).

Species
P. ampla Kim, 1972
P. baloghi Papp, 1978
P. bimaculata (Williston, 1896)
P. chimborazo (Richards, 1965)
P. cooki Kim, 1972
P. costaricensis Papp, 1978
P. curiosa Kim, 1972
P. currani Kim, 1972
P. dobzhanskyi Kim, 1972
P. ecuadoria (Richards, 1965)
P. facialis Papp, 1978
P. flavicoxa (Malloch, 1925)
P. guttula (Richards, 1965)
P. insolita Kim, 1972
P. levicastilli (Richards, 1965)
P. megaventralis Kim, 1972
P. monomaculata Kim, 1972
P. nigrifemur (Malloch, 1925)
P. pallipes (Malloch, 1914)
P. paratransversa Papp, 1978
P. parva Kim, 1972
P. prosovaripes Kim, 1972
P. sabroskyi Kim, 1972
P. simplex Kim, 1972
P. subdissecta Papp, 1978
P. subguttula Papp, 1978
P. tertia (Richards, 1965)
P. transversa (Richards, 1965)
P. transversalis (Richards, 1965)
P. trapezina (Richards, 1965)
P. varipes (Malloch, 1925)
P. xiphosternum (Richards, 1965)
P. zicsii Papp, 1978

References

Sphaeroceridae
Diptera of South America
Taxa named by Samuel Wendell Williston
Sphaeroceroidea genera